Michelle Grattan  (born 30 June 1944) is an Australian journalist who was the first woman to become editor of an Australian metropolitan daily newspaper. Specialising in political journalism, she has written for and edited many significant Australian newspapers. She is currently the chief political correspondent with The Conversation, Australia's largest independent news website.

Career 
Grattan was educated in Kew, Victoria at Ruyton Girls' School. She completed a Bachelor of Arts at the University of Melbourne, majoring in politics, and then worked as a tutor at Monash University for a period before deciding to pursue journalism as a career. Grattan was recruited by The Age newspaper in 1970, and joined the Canberra Press Gallery in 1971. In 1976, she was appointed the Chief Political Correspondent for The Age, a position she would hold until 1993. After leaving The Age in 1993, Grattan was appointed the Editor of The Canberra Times, becoming the first female editor of a metropolitan daily newspaper in Australia. After two years in this position she was sacked and returned to The Age, where she became the political editor.

In 1996, Grattan joined The Australian Financial Review as a senior writer, and three years later, was appointed Chief Political Correspondent at The Sydney Morning Herald. She returned to The Age in 2002 as a columnist, and was made Political Editor and Bureau Chief in 2004.

On 4 February 2013 she announced her resignation from The Age to take up a position as professorial fellow at the University of Canberra. and to become the Chief Political Correspondent of The Conversation.

Grattan has co-authored several books, including Can Ministers Cope?, Back on the Wool Track and Reformers, and has edited collections such as Australian Prime Ministers and Reconciliation.

Honours 
In 1988, Grattan was awarded the Graham Perkin Australian Journalist of the Year Award. In 2002 she was elected a Fellow of the Academy of the Social Sciences in Australia. In the Australia Day Honours in 2004, Grattan was made an Officer of the Order of Australia (AO) for her long and distinguished service to Australian journalism. She won a Walkley Award for Journalism Leadership in 2006. She is an adjunct professor at the University of Queensland's School of Journalism and Communication. Grattan was awarded an honorary Doctor of Letters by the University of Sydney in 2017.

Notes

References

Sources

External links 
 Grattan's opinion pieces in "The Age"
 Grattan's pieces for "The Conversation"
 

1944 births
Living people
Academic staff of the University of Canberra
Australian book editors
Australian newspaper editors
Australian political journalists
Australian women editors
Australian women journalists
Walkley Award winners
Officers of the Order of Australia
Place of birth missing (living people)
Women newspaper editors
People educated at Ruyton Girls' School
Fellows of the Academy of the Social Sciences in Australia
University of Melbourne alumni
The Sydney Morning Herald people
People from Kew, Victoria
Journalists from Melbourne